The SunMed BRT station is located on Jalan Lagoon Selatan, Bandar Sunway, Subang Jaya, Selangor, and is served by the BRT Sunway Line. Like other BRT stations on this line, it is elevated.

The station is located beside Sunway Medical Centre, and is connected to Taylor's University through an  skyway. The station serves both of the institutions.

Gallery

References

Bus rapid transit in Malaysia
Buildings and structures in Selangor
2015 establishments in Malaysia